Gordon Behind Bars is a British television series in which Gordon Ramsay teaches inmates of Brixton prison how to cook. It was broadcast in four episodes from 26 June – 17 July 2012 on Channel 4.

Premise
Ramsay, a Michelin Star Chef in the UK, enters Brixton prison over a six-month period (December 2011 to June 2012) with the goal of teaching inmates how to cook and run a sustainable business selling goods prepared inside the prison to the general public.

Bad Boys' Bakery
After some training from Ramsay, the inmate cooks of Brixton prison are formed into a business dubbed "Bad Boys' Bakery", under the slogan "Life Changing Taste", selling a Ramsay version of a lemon treacle tart (later changed to a lemon treacle slice). Eventually, Ramsay was able to negotiate an agreement for a trial order of 100 bars (per location) to be sold in 11 Caffè Nero locations across South London. As of September 2017, the tarts remain available at 15 outlets, while there are plans to expand to 190 locations throughout London.

The cooks
Of the twelve cooks originally chosen to take part, five had left the program by the end of the series. In the fourth episode, five additional inmates were recruited to replace them, and five more were recruited after Ramsay had left.

Original twelve cooks

UK ratings

Safety issues
During filming of the program, there were incidents where fights would break out. Ramsay has stated "I was standing close by one bloke with another opposite me, and then this guy lunged over and went to headbutt him. I had to sort it out." Ramsay's wife was also concerned about his safety and instructed him to take self-defence classes.

US version
Ramsay personally pitched the idea of an American version to Kevin Reilly at Fox Broadcasting; however, Reilly declined, saying, "We have a lot of Gordon on the air right now."

References

External links 

2012 British television series debuts
2012 British television series endings
Channel 4 original programming
British cooking television shows
British prison television series
Television series by All3Media
English-language television shows
Television shows set in London